The Organisation of Development Action and Maintenance (ODAM) is a Non Governmental Organisation (NGO).  It was established in 1995, under the Tamil Nadu Societies Registration Act of 1975. The central location of ODAM is in Tiruchuli; the organization's work is spread across 205 villages in Tiruchuli, Narikudi, Kariyapatti, Aruppukottair and Watrap blocks of Virudhunagar district, and Kamuthi block in Ramnad district, of Tamil Nadu, India.

External links
ODAM WEBSITE

Organisations based in Tamil Nadu
1995 establishments in Tamil Nadu
Organizations established in 1995